Luther Etherton Grice (June 23, 1881 - June 4, 1953) was an attorney and a Democratic member of the Mississippi Senate, representing the state's 11th senatorial district from 1940 to 1944.

Biography 
Luther Etherton Grice was born on June 23, 1881, in Lawrence County, Mississippi. He graduated from Millsaps College. He practiced law in Crystal Springs for 26 years. He was a member of the Mississippi Senate, representing the state's 11th senatorial district (Copiah County) as a Democrat, from 1940 to 1944. He died on June 4, 1953, in Crystal Springs, Mississippi.

References 

1881 births
1953 deaths
Democratic Party Mississippi state senators
Mississippi lawyers
People from Crystal Springs, Mississippi